Abdul Aziz Naik (September 29, 1936 – May 2, 2014) was a Pakistani field hockey player. He was the fourth son to his father Ghulam Mohy Uddin Naik and mother Hakim Bibi. Born in Peshawar, Pakistan on 29 September 1936, Aziz Naik was a patriot to his country. Aziz Naik served in the Pakistan Airforce in 1952 and later became a national celebrity when he represented Pakistan in Summer Olympics: Melbourne in 1956.  Graduated from Punjab University, Aziz Naik played for University Eleven 1948. Represented N.W.F.P. in National Championships in 1949-50. Played for the Pakistan Airforce in 1952. Aziz Naik represented Pakistan against German Eleven in 1954 and toured with the Pakistan National Hockey Team in Singapore and Malaya in 1955. In 1956, Aziz Naik was a member of Pakistan field hockey team at Summer Olympics in Melbourne, Australia where his country won a Silver Medal.

In 1957 Aziz Naik emigrated to Montreal, Canada, where he established his Wholesale Sporting Goods business. Then in 1963 he married a Canadian French women Denise Le Goff from which three sons were born: Atif, Ali, and Jamil. Aziz Naik was very active in the Muslim community in Montreal, and between 1972 and 1979 he headed the Pakistani community in Montreal's Islamic Centre of Learning. Aziz Naik was one of the leading Founders of the first Islamic Modern Mosque in Canada in 1959.

Death
He died on 2 May 2014 in Montreal, Canada.

See also 
List of Pakistani field hockey players

References 

1936 births
Olympic field hockey players of Pakistan
Pakistani male field hockey players
2014 deaths
Pakistani emigrants to Canada
Naturalized citizens of Canada